Amirreza Abdullahi (October 7, 2005 – November 25, 2018) was one of the victims of Iran's November 2018 protests.

Death 
On November 25, 2018, on the second day of public protests against the increase in gasoline prices, Amirreza Abdullahi left home for work. While passing near one of the areas where the protesters had gathered, he was shot by the security officers and died. After three days, Amirreza Abdullahi's body was handed over to the family on 28 November 2018 and was buried in Parsabad, Moghan.

See also 

 2019–2020 Iranian protests

References 

2005 births
2018 deaths
People killed in protests in Iran